() is a junior non-commissioned officer rank used by the . It is also the collective name for all non-commissioned officers in Austria and Germany. It was formerly a rank in the Imperial Russian Army.

Austria

, also , is the collective name to all junior NCO-ranks in the modern day's Austrian Bundesheer. It comprises the ranks of the assignment group M BUO 2 (professional NCO 2; de: Berufsunteroffizier 2) with the rank Oberwachtmeister (OR6), and  M ZUO 2 (time serving NCO 2; de: Zeitunteroffizier 2) with the rank Wachtmeister (OR5).

Training and education of the Unteroffizier corps was reformed in 1995 and until 2000 finally introduced to the armed forces. First effected were professional NCOs of the assignment group M BUO 1 (Stabsunteroffiziere, staff NCO's), followed by the assignment group M BUO 2 (Unteroffiziere, NCO's).

In the result of a positive entrance examination aspirants attended the NCO trainings course (new) on the Heeresunteroffiziersakademie (HUAk) in Enns. After positive HUAk-graduation regular assignments to a Unteroffizier might be squad leader (de: Gruppenkommandant), or service in a military staff or headquarters.

Germany 

In German military, Unteroffizier ("subordinate officer") is both a specific military rank as well as a generic term for any non-commissioned officer (NCO) in the army and air force, while in the navy the term Deckoffizier is used. It has existed since the 17th century.

Unteroffizier means a specific junior NCO rank of both the Heer and Luftwaffe. It is placed between Gefreiter and Feldwebel, roughly equivalent to a British/Commonwealth army Corporal.

Until the end of German Reich, the equivalent of Unteroffizier rank in Jäger units was Oberjäger.

The term Unteroffizier continues to be used by the German Bundeswehr.

There are two classes of non-commissioned officers
Unteroffiziere ohne Portepee, comprising:
Unteroffizier and Fahnenjunker (Maat ⇒ see main article German Navy)
Stabsunteroffizier (Obermaat)
Unteroffiziere mit Portepee, comprising:
Feldwebel and Fähnrich (Bootsmann)
Oberfeldwebel (Oberbootsmann)
Hauptfeldwebel and Oberfähnrich (Hauptbootsmann)
Stabsfeldwebel (Stabsbootsmann)
Oberstabsfeldwebel (Oberstabsbootsmann)

Informally, the non-commissioned officers "mit Portepee" are often called "Feldwebel ranks", which creates confusion as the collective term Unteroffizier already exists. The word Unteroffizier, in turn, is getting a third meaning, namely: non-commissioned officer ohne Portepee, as opposed to "Feldwebel ranks".

Unteroffizier translates as "subordinate-officer" and, when meaning the specific rank, is in modern-day usage considered the equivalent to sergeant under the NATO rank scale. Historically the Unteroffizier rank was considered a corporal and thus similar in duties to a British Army corporal. In peacetime an Unteroffizier was a career soldier who trained conscripts or led squads and platoons. He could rise through the ranks to become an Unteroffizier mit Portepee, i.e. a Feldwebel, which was the highest rank a career soldier could reach. Since the German officer corps was immensely class conscious a rise through the ranks from a NCO to become an officer was hardly possible except in times of war.

The Unteroffizierskorps was made up of professional soldiers which formed the backbone of German armies. This tradition has not been changed by the Bundeswehr where all ranks of Unteroffizier and up consist only of professional soldiers who sign up for a period extending conscription.

Unteroffizier is one of the few German military ranks whose insignia has remained unchanged over the past one hundred years.  The shoulder boards of a modern Unteroffizier are relatively similar to the World War I and World War II designs.

A modern-day German Bundeswehr Unteroffizier typically commands squad sized formations or acts as an assistant platoon NCO. The rank is also used in the modern-day German Air Force. In the Bundeswehr the grade of Stabsunteroffizier (a junior NCO) ranks between Unteroffizier and Feldwebel.

Nazi Germany
 There sequence of grades in Heer, Luftwaffe and Kriegsmarine was as follows 
Unteroffiziere ohne Portepee, comprising:
Unteroffizier (Maat ⇒ see main article Kriegsmarine Rank insignia)
Unterfeldwebel (Obermaat)
Unteroffiziere mit Portepee, comprising:
Feldwebel (Bootsmann)
Heer & Luftwaffe no grade (Stabsbootsmann)
Oberfeldwebel (Oberbootsmann)
Stabsfeldwebel (Stabsoberbootsmann)

Rank insignia Unteroffizier Wehrmacht and equivalent grades Waffen-SS

East Germany

By the East German National People's Army (NP's A) and the Border troops the grade was introduced in 1956, comparable to NATO OR-6b. The rank insignia remained almost identically to these Wehrmacht and Reichswehr. There designation of the two classes of non-commissioned officers, i.e. "Unteroffiziere ohne Portepee" and "Unteroffiziere mit Portepee", was generally disapproved by the East German communist military leadership, and consequently uncustomary.

There sequence of grades was as follows:
Unteroffizier (Maat ⇒ see main article Volksmarine)
Unterfeldwebel (Obermaat)
Feldwebel (Meister)
Oberfeldwebel (Obermeister)
Stabsfeldwebel (Stabsobermeister)

Rank insignia

Russia

In the Russian Imperial Army, the rank of Unteroffizier (Under Officer) was borrowed from Germany. From the early 1800s, it was split into the Senior and Junior Under Officers, which had 2 and 3 thin horizontal stripes on shoulder boards, respectively. Under Officers were superior to Gefreiter and junior to Feldfebel.

References

Sources 
Dictionary to the German military history, 1st edition (Liz.5, P189/84, LSV:0547, B-Nr. 746 635 0), military publishing house of the GDR (VEB) – Berlin, 1985, Volume 2, page 1013.

Military ranks of Germany
ru:Унтер-офицер